The Charmouth Mudstone Formation is a geological formation in England, dating to the Early Jurassic (Sinemurian–Pliensbachian). It forms part of the lower Lias Group. It is most prominently exposed at its type locality in cliff section between Lyme Regis and Charmouth (alongside the underlying Blue Lias) but onshore it extends northwards to Market Weighton, Yorkshire, and in the subsurface of the East Midlands Shelf and Wessex Basin. The formation is notable for its fossils, including those of ammonites and marine reptiles and rare dinosaur remains. The formation played a prominent role in the history of early paleontology, with its Lyme Regis-Charmouth exposure being frequented by fossil collectors including Mary Anning.

Stratigraphy

Shales With Beef Member 
The Shales With Beef Member is around 28–30 metres thick in the Lyme Regis-Charmouth region and predominantly consists of thinly bedded medium to dark grey mudstone, blocky calcareous pale-weathering mudstone and brown-grey organic-rich mudstones with frequent bedding parallel veins of fibrous calcite ("beef"), that are usually less than 10 centimetres thick. Several beds of nodular and tabular limestone are also present. It is the lowest unit of the formation and directly overlies the Blue Lias Formation, with the boundary being marked by a prominent bioturbated horizon. Notable persistent marker beds within the member include the laminated calcareous siltstone "Fish Bed",  "Table Ledge", which consists of lens beds of limestones with mud content with nests of rhynchonellid brachiopods, the Devonshire Head and the Spittles limestones and the Birchi Nodules (which are septarian concretions) The upper boundary with the Black Ven Marl Member is marked by the prominent laterally persistent limestone Birchi Tabular Bed.

Black Ven Marl Member 
The Black Ven Marl Member is around 43 metres thick consists of thinly bedded dark mudstones, with several laterally persistent cementstone horizons, notable horizons include the Lower and Upper Cement beds and the Stellare nodules.

Belemnite Marl Member 
The Belemnite Marl Member is around 20 to 27 metres thick, and consists of interbedded pale and dark grey calcareous mudstone, with numerous belemnites, hence the name. The top of the member is marked by the Belemnite Stone Bed

Green Ammonite Member 
The Green Ammonite Member is up to 31 metres thick predominantly consists of medium grey mudstones, with 3 limestone horizons, Lower Limestone; Red Band, and Upper Limestone, it is conformably overlain by the Dyrham Formation in some areas, but in the Charmouth area there is an erosive unconformable boundary with the much younger Early Cretaceous (Albian) aged Gault clays.

Paleobiota

Ammonites

Sauropterygia

Ichthyosauria

Thalattosuchia

Pterosauria

Dinosauria

Fish 
Numerous fish species are known from the Charmouth Mudstone and underlying Blue Lias, from such horizons as the "Fish Bed" of the Shales With Beef Member.

Insects 
Numerous species of insect are known from concretions, predominately in the Black Ven Marl Member.

See also 
 List of fossiliferous stratigraphic units in England

References 

Geologic formations of England
Jurassic England
Jurassic System of Europe
Sinemurian Stage
Pliensbachian Stage